The Omega Point is a supposed future when everything in the universe spirals toward a final point of unification. The term was invented by the French Jesuit Catholic priest Pierre Teilhard de Chardin (1881–1955). Teilhard argued that the Omega Point resembles the Christian Logos, namely Christ, who draws all things into himself, who in the words of the Nicene Creed, is "God from God", "Light from Light", "True God from true God", and "through him all things were made". In the Book of Revelation, Christ describes himself thrice as "the Alpha and the Omega, the beginning and the end". The idea of the Omega Point is developed in later writings, such as those of John David Garcia (1971), Paolo Soleri (1981), Frank Tipler (1994), and David Deutsch (1997).

Pierre Teilhard de Chardin's theory

Etymology

Teilhard de Chardin was a paleontologist and Roman Catholic priest in the Jesuit order. In France in the 1920s, he began incorporating his theories of the universe into lectures that placed Catholicism and evolution in the same conversation. Because of these lectures, he was suspected by the Holy Office of denying the doctrine of original sin. This caused Teilhard to be exiled to China and banned from publication by Church authorities. It was not until one year after his death in 1955 that his writings were published for the world to read. His works were also supported by the writings of a group of Catholic thinkers, which includes Pope Benedict XVI. His book The Phenomenon of Man has been dissected by astrophysicists and cosmologists, and is now viewed as a work positing a theological or philosophical theory that cannot be scientifically proven. Teilhard, who was not a cosmologist, opens his books with the statement:

Evolution

According to Teilhard, evolution does not end with mankind and Earth's biosphere evolved before humans existed. He described evolution as a progression that begins with inanimate matter to a future state of Divine consciousness through Earth's "hominization". He also maintained that one-cell organisms develop into metazoans or animals, but some of the members of this classification develop organisms with complex nervous systems. This group has the capability to acquire intelligence. When Homo sapiens inhabited Earth through evolution, a noosphere, the cognitive layer of existence, was created. As evolution continues, the noosphere gains coherence. Teilhard explained that this noosphere can be moved toward or constructed to be the Omega Point or the final evolutionary stage with the help of science. Teilhard refers to this process as "planetization". Eventually, the noosphere gains total dominance over the biosphere and reaches a point of complete independence from tangential energy forming a metaphysical being, coined the Omega Point.

Energy

Energy exists in two basic modes:
 "Tangential Energy": energy that can be measured by physics.
 "Radial Energy": spiritual energy which accumulates into a higher state as time progresses.

Teilhard defines Radial Energy as becoming more concentrated and available as it is a critical element in man's evolution. The theory applies to all forms of matter, concluding that everything with existence has some sort of life. In regard to Teilhard's The Phenomenon of Man, Peter Medawar wrote, "Teilhard's radial, spiritual, or psychic energy may be equated to 'information' or 'information content' in the sense that has been made reasonably precise by communication engineers."

Formal properties

Teilhard's theory is maintained by four formal properties:
 Humans will escape the heat death of the universe. Certain current scientific understandings imply that intelligence cannot survive heat death. He theorizes that since radial energy is non-compliant with entropy, it escapes the collapses of forces at world's end.
 The Omega Point does not exist within the timeline of the universe, it occurs at the exact edge of the end of time. From that point, all sequences of existence are sucked into its being.
 The Omega Point can be understood as a volume shaped like a cone in which each section taken from the base to its summit decreases until it diminishes into a final point.
 The volume described in the Third Property must be understood as an entity with finite boundaries. Teilhard explains:

Forces of compression

Teilhard calls the contributing universal energy that generates the Omega Point "forces of compression". Unlike the scientific definition, which incorporates gravity and mass, Teilhard's forces of compression sources from communication and contact between human beings. This value is limitless and directly correlated with entropy. It suggests that as humans continue to interact, consciousness evolves and grows. For the theory to occur, humans must also be bound to the finite earth. The creation of this boundary forces the world's convergence upon itself which he theorizes to result in time ending in communion with the Omega Point-God. This portion of Teilhard's thinking shows his lack of expectation for humans to engage in space travel and transcend past the borders of the planet.

The Omega Point cosmology 

Mathematical physicist Frank Tipler generalizes Teilhard's term Omega Point to describe what he maintains is the ultimate fate of the universe required by the laws of physics: roughly, Tipler argues that quantum mechanics is inconsistent unless the future of every point in spacetime contains an intelligent observer to collapse the wavefunction and that the only way for this to happen is if the Universe is closed (that is, it will collapse to a single point) and yet contains observers with a "God-like" ability to perform an unbounded series of observations in finite time.

Theological controversy

Pierre Teilhard de Chardin's life (1881–1955) falls directly in between the First Vatican Council (1869) and the Second Vatican Council (1965). His time came shortly after Charles Darwin's 1859 book, On the Origin of Species, a time when the intersection between the claims of scientific theories and the claims of traditional theological teachings became an enormous focus of the Vatican's agenda.

Pope Pius XII stated his concern on the theory of evolution, albeit without condemning it:

Teilhard's theory was a personal attempt in creating a new Christianity in which science and theology coexist. The outcome was that his theory of the Omega Point was not perfectly scientific as examined by physicists, and not perfectly Christian either. By 1962, The Society of Jesus had strayed from Spanish Jesuit Priest Francisco Suarez's philosophies on Man in favor of "Teilhardian evolutionary cosmogenesis". Teilhard's Christ is the "Cosmic Christ" or the "Omega" of revelation. He is an emanation of God which is made of matter and experienced the nature of evolution by being born into this world and dying. His resurrection from the dead was not to heaven, but to the noosphere, the area of convergence of all spirituality and spiritual beings, where Christ will be waiting at the end of time. When the earth reaches its Omega Point, everything that exists will become one with divinity.

Teilhard reaffirms the role of the Church in the following letter to Auguste Valensin. It is important to note that he defines evolution as a scientific phenomenon set in motion by God – that science and the divine are interconnected and acting through one another:

Related concepts

Accelerating expansion of the universe 

In 1998, a value measured from observations of Type Ia supernovae seemed to indicate that what was once assumed to be temporary cosmological expansion was actually accelerating. The apparent acceleration has caused many to dismiss Tipler's Omega Point out of hand since the necessity of a final big crunch singularity is key to the Omega Point's workability. However, Tipler himself believes that the Omega Point is still workable and has explained on multiple occasions why a big crunch/ final singularity is still required under many current universal models.

Technological singularity
The technological singularity is the hypothetical advent of artificial general intelligence theoretically capable of recursive self-improvement, resulting in a runaway effect to an intelligence explosion. Eric Steinhart, a proponent of "Christian transhumanism", argues there is a significant overlap of ideas between the secular singularity and Teilhard's religious Omega Point. Steinhart quotes Ray Kurzweil, one of the most prominent singularitarians, who stated that "evolution moves inexorably toward our conception of God, albeit never reaching this ideal."  Like Kurzweil, Teilhard predicts a period of rapid technological change that results in a merger of humanity and technology. He believes that this marks the birth of the noosphere and the emergence of the "spirit of the Earth", but the Teilhardian Singularity comes later. Unlike Kurzweil, Teilhard's singularity is marked by the evolution of human intelligence reaching a critical point in which humans ascend from "transhuman" to "posthuman". He identifies this with the Christian "parousia".

In popular culture

The Spanish painter Salvador Dalí was fascinated by Teilhard de Chardin and the Omega Point theory. His 1959 painting The Ecumenical Council is said to represent the "interconnectedness" of the Omega Point. Point Omega by Don DeLillo takes its name from the theory and involves a character who is studying Teilhard de Chardin. Flannery O'Connor's acclaimed collection of short stories taps the Omega Point theory in its title, Everything That Rises Must Converge, and science fiction writer Frederik Pohl references Frank Tipler and the Omega Point in his 1998 short story "The Siege of Eternity". Scottish writer / counterculture figure Grant Morrison has used the Omega Point as a plot line in several of his Justice League of America and Batman stories.

Arthur C. Clarke and Stephen Baxter's The Light of Other Days references Teilhard de Chardin and includes a brief explanation of the Omega Point. Italian writer Valerio Evangelisti has used the Omega Point as main theme of his Il Fantasma di Eymerich novel. In William Peter Blatty's novel The Exorcist, the character of Father Merrin references Omega Point. In 2021, Dutch symphonic metal band Epica released their eighth studio album, Omega, which features concepts related to the Omega Point theory. Epica's guitarist and vocalist, Mark Jansen, specifically referenced Teilhard's theory when describing the album's concept.

See also

Related concepts
 Apocatastasis
 Artificial life
 Eschatology
 Great chain of being
 Metasystem transition
 Timewave zero
 Noosphere
 Posthuman
 Superintelligence
 Supermind (integral yoga)
 Technological singularity
 Teleology
 Transhumanism
Related people
 Elisabet Sahtouris
 Nikolai Fyodorovich Fyodorov
 Vladimir Vernadsky
 Wolfhart Pannenberg

References

External links
 Computer history's stride towards an expected Omega Point by Jürgen Schmidhuber, from "The New AI: General & Sound & Relevant for Physics", In B. Goertzel and C. Pennachin, eds.: Artificial General Intelligence, p. 175-198, 2006.
 Essays by Tipler on the Omega Point
 Human Evolution Research Institute
 Princeton Noosphere project cites Teilhard de Chardin
 Teilhard de Chardin on evolution

Christian eschatology
Concepts in metaphysics
Mysticism
Panentheism
Pantheism
Philosophy of religion
Philosophy of science
Philosophy of technology
Religion and science
Singularitarianism

he:פייר טיילר דה שרדן#רעיונותיו